Albion Marku (born 14 October 2000) is an Albanian professional footballer who currently play as a central midfielder for Albanian club Dinamo Tirana .

References

2000 births
Living people
People from Rrëshen
People from Mirditë
People from Lezhë County
Albanian footballers
Albanian expatriate footballers
Association football midfielders
KF Shënkolli players
FK Kukësi players
KF Mirdita players
Shkëndija Tiranë players
NK Lokomotiva Zagreb players
KF Laçi players
Kategoria Superiore players
Albanian expatriate sportspeople in Croatia
Expatriate footballers in Croatia
Albania international footballers